Marion Bauman is a former East German slalom canoeist who competed in the 1970s. She won two medals in the K-1 team event with a silver in 1975 and a bronze in 1973.

References

External links 
 Marion BAUMAN at CanoeSlalom.net

East German female canoeists
Living people
Year of birth missing (living people)
Medalists at the ICF Canoe Slalom World Championships